WQDC (97.7 FM) is a radio station licensed to Sturgeon Bay, Wisconsin, United States, the station is currently owned by Michael & Carrie Mesic, through licensee Case Communications LLC.

History
The station recently changed formats from a Hot AC format in May 2008. The station had been branded "Star 97.7" under the previous format.

On April 1, 2013, WSRG relaunched as "Door Country 97.7" under the new WQDC call letters.

On the evening of April 1, 2016 WQDC flipped to classic hits as "Rewind 97.7". The station posted a Facebook post to explain the change, saying "when Door Country FM 97.7 re-launched three years ago, there were 4 County stations audible here in Door County. Today there are 7. Reaching number one in the format was a big goal for Case Communications; we have done that, and again, thank you for your listenership and participation. Now comes the time that we can no longer ignore the wants and changing needs of Door County listeners and advertisers."

References

External links
WQDC official website

Classic hits radio stations in the United States
QDC
Door County, Wisconsin